An-Sophie Mestach was the defending champion, but chose not to participate.

Jana Fett won the title, defeating Luksika Kumkhum in the final 6–4, 4–6, 6–4.

Seeds

Main draw

Finals

Top half

Bottom half

References 
 Main draw

Dunlop World Challenge - Singles
Dunlop World Challenge
2015 Dunlop World Challenge